The Pontifical and Royal University of Santo Tomas celebrated its 400th anniversary in 2011. The agenda before the  quadricentennial in 2011 included the introduction of new academic programs, improvements in the university's infrastructure, and other projects to raise UST's national and international prominence and promote its role as a social catalyst.

Plans to open satellite campuses in Santa Rosa, Laguna, and General Santos are being put in place.

Physical developments for the Sampaloc campus are ongoing. The Plaza Mayor in front the Main Building, the Quadricentennial Square which will feature the Tetraglobal sculpture, the Quadricentennial Fountain, and the Quadricentennial Alumni Walkway were constructed in 2006. To accommodate the needs of extra space for the growing number of student activities, the UST Tan Yan Kee Student Center was built in front of the Miguel de Benavides Library. The more than 80-year-old Main Building, and the artifacts and art works in the UST Museum of Arts and Sciences, were placed under the preservation of the UST Heritage Conservation program in December 2008.

The UST Benavides Cancer Institute, part of the five-year redevelopment plan and expansion of the UST Hospital for its 60-year celebration and the quadricentennial celebration, was established in 2006.

Part of the university's infrastructure modernization is the construction of an P800-million, four-storey gymnasium capable of seating 5,792, designed by Thomasian architects José Pedro Recio and Carmelo T. Casas. University officials, led by Rector Rolando V. de la Rosa, O.P., led its groundbreaking ceremonies in August 2008.

The UST Publishing House in 2001 launched its quadricentennial project, "400 Books at 400!", publishing books in a range of disciplines, from theology to literature to medicine, written in both Filipino and English.

Quadricentennial Commission 
A Quadricentennial Commission was created to formulate preparations for the celebration of the UST Quadricentennial Jubilee. The commission is chaired by the UST rector, Rev. Fr. Rolando V. de la Rosa, O.P. The following are its members:
 Chairman (Rector)
 Vice Chairman (Vice Rector)
 Secretary (Assistant to the Rector for Administration)
 Committees
 Quadricentennial Committee (Assistant to the Rector for Grants and Endowment)
 Major Infrastructure Projects Committee (Facilities Management Office Director)
 External Relations Committee (Office of the Alumni Affairs)
 Grand Celebrations Committee (Secretary General)
 Documentation and Publication Committee (Office for Public Affairs / Executive Secretary of the Rector)
 Media and Publicity Committee (Office for Public Affairs / EdTech).

Symbolization

Logo 
The Tongues of Fire is the official logo for the quadricentennial celebration. It features the outline of the UST Main Building Tower as a concrete symbol of the stability, integrity and 400 years of existence of the university. From the cross of the Main Building emanate four tongues of fire that spell out U, S, and T. The tongues of fire reference the future of the university and some ideals, and are reminiscent of the stripes of the Tiger, the school's mascot. The quadricentennial logo was designed by Dopy Doplon, a Thomasian.

Song 
"Ako'y Isang Tomasino", composed by UST Faculty of Engineering alumnus Gerry de Leon, is the official theme song of the celebration. It bested four other finalists in the Q Songwriting Contest Grand Finals held the previous December at the Albertus Magnus Auditorium. It was performed by Sam Velarde, a friend of de Leon, from other university. The song was launched during the “400 days to 400 years Countdown” on December 18 at the UST football field.

Prayer 
The quadricentennial prayer was unveiled to the public during the “400 days to 400 years Countdown” on Dec. 18. It was recited by Fr. Pompeyo de Mesa, O.P. with a candle-lighting ceremony.

Flag 
The quadricentennial flag consists of two horizontal stripes of equal width, the upper one gold and the lower one white. These are defined as school colors of the university because of its Pontifical status. Embroidered with "2011", the flag features the sun and the colors yellow and blue, taken from the logo of the university.

Countdown Clock 
The countdown clock, which is a Swatch Beatman, is produced by Swiss watch company Swatch. It is designed by former Varsitarian art director Jonathan Gamalinda.

Mascot 
The mascot is named "QUSTER", which stands for Quadricentennial University of Santo Tomas Tiger.

Infrastructure

University Marker 
A one-foot-by-three-feet marble marker in Plaza Intramuros near the main vehicular entrance of the campus was unveiled on February 4, 2010. It was designed by architect John Joseph T. Fernandez, Dean of the College of Architecture, and architect Froilan M. Fontecha, faculty member of the same college. It bears the name of the university, its seal on the left, and the year 1611 on the right.

Quadricentennial Square
Replacing the old Colayco Park and its adjacent UST Cooperative Center, the Quadricentennial Square was built as a memorial of the university's four centuries of existence. It has two main features: the Quadricentennial Fountain and the Quattromondial. It is located between the Main Building and the Miguel de Benavides Library.

The Colayco Shrine, an iron statue commemorating the World War 2 victim Capt. Manuel Colayco, was nowhere to be found since its removal from the site in 2006.

Fountain 
This recreational and interactive fountain was unveiled in 2007. It was designed and built by Industron Inc., the same designer of Cultural Center of the Philippines and Liwasang Bonifacio fountains in Manila.

The fountain has sun-like floor patterns to pay tribute to the university's patron saint, Thomas Aquinas. Its four cornerstones highlight UST milestones during its first four centuries.

According to UST Facilities Management Office administrator Antonio Espejo, the fountain uses recycled water treated with chlorine. It runs three times a day (6AM to 8AM, 11AM to 1PM, and 5PM to 8PM).

There is a superstition that to counter the effect of passing through the Arch of the Centuries while studying in the university, a student must take a shower in the fountain, as this will cleanse him and prevent the happening of an event that will bar the student from graduating.

Quattromondial 
This artwork was unveiled for the Quadricentennial celebrations on January 27, 2011. This is a ten-meter-high structure of bronze and glass, made by artist Ramon Orlina, a UST alumnus.
 
The monument features four figures, which, according to Orlina, represent the school's four centuries:

The young Filipino student represents excellence, and was modeled by actor Piolo Pascual.
The young Filipina student represents tradition, and was modeled by Orlina's daughter Monina.
The Thomasian teacher represents erudition, and was modeled by beauty queen Charlene Gonzales.
The Dominican friar-scholar represents spirituality, and was modeled by Fr. Rolando V. dela Rosa, O.P.

Upon the four near-naked figures, whose genitals are covered by a long strip of ribbon, rests a globe; and like the earth, it tilts 23.5 degrees. The globe represents globalization, with all its benefits and hindrances, such as environmental degradation and cultural divisions. The ribbon streams out of the globe, printed with an inscription in Latin signifying accomplishment, scholarliness and wisdom. It reads:

UST Gymnasium and Sports Complex

Replacing the original UST Gymnasium and the old Engineering Sports Complex, the construction of the 800-million-peso UST Sports Complex began after the Vatican gave its "blessing" to the project. It was to be inaugurated on August 15, 2011.

Officially named the Quadricentennial Pavilion, the sports complex was designed by Thomasian architects Jose Pedro Recio and Carmelo Rosas. It stands on what used to be the Engineering Sports Complex, basketball courts, and the adjacent football field. It houses training areas for gymnastics, aerobics, taekwondo, judo, table tennis, fencing, and badminton at its ground floor. It features a ticket counter, a museum, a dance hall for the Salinggawi Dance Troupe, and a fitness room. Its main attraction is a basketball court surrounded by bleachers rising up to the fourth level.

Thomasian Alumni Center 

To be built on the site of the original UST Gymnasium, the alumni center will be used as a venue for alumni gatherings, various university events, and lodging services for visitors. It is according to the pursuit of the university's Office for Alumni Relations to build a center to cater to the growing number of UST Alumni. The existing Olympic-sized swimming pool located nearby would be kept and refurbished. It was projected to be completed and opened in 2012.

Its design was chosen from seven winners in a competition among students organized by the College of Architecture. Abelardo Tolentino Jr., an outstanding Thomasian alumni for Architecture, worked on the design to produce the final blueprint.

US-based Thomasian medical practitioners raised and donated US$1 million to assist the construction of the alumni center.

UST Hospital extension building 
The blessing of the construction site of the UST Hospital's extension building was held on 23 January 2012, the first day of the closing week of the quadricentennial celebrations. Once constructed, the services in the USTH Medical Arts building will be transferred there. The medical arts building will then be demolished to give way to another construction of a new medical arts facility.

University sites as National Cultural Treasures 
Four structures within the university's campus were declared National Cultural Treasures by the National Museum. The declaration was made on 25 January 2010. These sites were: 
The Main Building (the first earthquake-resistant building in the Philippines)
Arch of the Centuries (the remnant of UST's original building from Intramuros)
Central Seminary (the home of the oldest college of Ecclesiastical studies in the Philippines)
The Grandstand and Parade Grounds (the venue where a mass celebrated by Pope John Paul II was held).

The Cultural Properties Preservation and Protection Act describes "National Cultural Treasures" as unique objects found in the Philippines that possess outstanding historical, cultural, artistic, and/or scientific value. These are considered as significant and important to the Philippines.

Another National Cultural Treasure was recently awarded to the university these are the UST Baybayin Documents which created in the years 1613 (Ducment a) and in 1625 (Document B).

Pre-2011 events

4 horas, 4 dias, 4 hundred days, 400 years 
The Quadricentennial countdown to 2011 coincided with UST's Christmas tradition, Paskuhan, held on December 18, 2009. The theme was called as such because the party lasted for 4 hours on December 18, which was 4 days before December 22, which was 400 days before January 28, 2011, which was the grand opening of UST's Quadricentennial celebrations. The official launch of the countdown was intended to be held on December 22, but the university was expected to be already on its Christmas vacation during that day.

January 28 is the feast day of St. Thomas Aquinas, the patron saint of the university, after which it was named. UST was founded on April 28, 1611.

The Paskuhan festivities and the Quadricentennial countdown were hosted by UST alumni - beauty queen Miriam Quiambao and TV personality Kim Atienza.

Simbahayan 400 
"Tomasino para sa Simbahan at Bayan" (Thomasians for the Church and the Country) is a socio-civic activity that began in January 2010. The Quadricentennial's "centerpiece project", according to the Rector Rev. Fr. Rolando De La Rosa, O.P., aims for UST to adopt some 400 villages with the help of non-governmental organization Gawad Kalinga.

Thomasian Global Trade Expo 
This three-day event was led by Thomasian tycoons such as Jollibee Foods Corp. president Tony Caktiong, and Mercury Drug president Vivian Que-Ascona in July 2010.

It was a three-day exposition of businesses owned and managed by Thomasian students or alumni. It was held at SMX Convention Center in the Mall of Asia Complex in Pasay. Begun on October 15, 2010, the expo featured a job fair; shopping bazaars; wellness festival; arts, design, and construction booths; celebrity shows; food and beverage stalls; entrepreneur workshops; and advocacy seminars. Jollibee Foods Corp.’s Tony Caktiong, Mercury Drug’s Viviene Que-Ascona, and Joel Cruz of Aficionado were among the Thomasian businessmen who joined.

The expo was a joint project of UST Alumni Association, UST Office for Alumni Affairs, and the UST Thomasian Alumni Leaders Association.

Some of the proceeds of this event funded the building of the Thomasian Alumni Center.

Lumina Pandit 
UST's rare book collections and historic documents were shown to the public through an exhibition in Miguel de Benavides Library. Lumina Pandit is Latin for "spreading the light." The exhibit showcased Doctrina Christiana, the first book published in the Philippines, a rare copy of Copernicus' book, and academic records of UST alumni, such as those of national heroes José Rizal and Apolinario Mabini, four Philippine presidents, and six Supreme Court chief justices.

Quadricentennial Week 
The Quadricentennial celebrations began with the Opening of the Jubilee Door and a Mass held on January 24, 2011.

Q Parade 
The Q Parade, held simultaneously with the Icusta opening, was joined by 7,200 students and 150 registered alumni.

The parade passed from UST to Morayta and then Recto and Mendiola. There were five floats, one each representing the four centuries of the university, and the "Q" float.

The first float represented the first century of the university with a replica of the statue of the founder, Msgr. Miguel de Benavides, O.P. The second float showed a model of the Arch of the Centuries. The third float was designed after the Main Building which was built on the España campus in the 1920s. The fourth float was patterned after the UST Central Seminary with the Fountains of Wisdom and Knowledge. The Q float showcased models of the yet to be unveiled Quattromondial, the future Martyrs' Monument, and the Tria Haec, or the statues representing faith, hope, and love atop the Main Building.

The first four floats carried candidates for the Ideal Thomasian Personalities (TSITP) while the Q float carried reigning Thomasian personalities, Ms. Earth - Eco Tourism 2009 Angela Fernando, businessman Joel Cruz, and alumni who have won beauty pageant titles.

Cheermania XVI 
This annual competition was held on January 26, 2011. The university also invited other schools' dance companies to compete with each other featuring different Philippine festivals.

Cheermania was won by College of Commerce Cheering Squad. The Philippine Festival's Invitational Competition was won by FEU Dance Company, organized by the UST Student Organizations Coordinating Council (UST SOCC).

International recognition

Holy See's recognition 
With UST being a pontifical university, Pope Benedict XVI was invited, and sent a special envoy, though he did not attend.

The pope declared a Jubilee year from January 2011 until January 2012, coinciding with the university's quadricentennial. The pope arranged to deliver a recorded video on January 28, feast day of St. Thomas Aquinas, and a thanksgiving mass was to be held.

In December 2010, the Roman Catholic Church's Apostolic Penitentiary allowed in a decree Archbishop Gaudencio Cardinal Rosales to bestow a papal blessing carrying a plenary indulgence in the Jubilee Mass held on January 24, 2011.

Upon the request of Rector Magnificus Fr. Rolando dela Rosa, O.P., a separate decree also granted plenary indulgences to participants.

Commemoration and memorabilia

Commemorative bills and medals 
Unveiled before the press conference held on January 21, 2011, Bangko Sentral ng Pilipinas (BSP) issued commemorative 200-peso bills with the UST Quadricentennial logo overprinted on them. BSP released two billion pesos' worth of these 200-peso bills into general circulation as legal tender (a total of 10 million pieces). The central bank also released 400 copies of uncut two-piece 200-peso bills (amounting to PhP 400.00).

BSP also issued commemorative gold and silver medals featuring the image of Msgr. Miguel de Benavides, O.P., the university's founder.

Commemorative stamps 
Named the Unending Grace stamps, the Philippine Postal Corp. issued four commemorative stamps with a 7-peso denomination. The designs featured were:
 UST Main Building
 Central Seminary
 Arch of the Centuries
 The Foundation of the University of Santo Tomas painting.

The PhilPost produced 100,000 pieces of these stamps, and 10,200 copies of souvenir sheets worth Php 37.00 each.

UST Quadricentennial Watch 
The Swiss company Swatch produced four different designer watches to commemorate the university's 400th jubilee year. The watches were named:
 The Thomasian
 Dominican Duo - White
 Dominican Duo - Black
 Quadricentennial Swatch.

Closing ceremony 
Dubbed the "Neo-centennial Celebration", this was a closing ceremony for the university's quadricentennial founding anniversary celebration which ran from January 23 to 27, 2012.

References

Anniversaries
University of Santo Tomas
2011 in the Philippines